Andreas Albrecht may refer to:

 Andreas Albrecht (cosmologist), theoretical physicist and cosmologist
 Andreas Albrecht (mathematician) (1586–1628), German mathematician and engineer
 Andreas Albrecht (chemist) (1927–2002), American physical chemist